Duncan McFadyen Rae  (2 June 1888 – 3 February 1964) was a New Zealand politician of the National Party.

Biography

Rae was born in Mataura in 1888. He received his education at Knox College and at Otago University, where he gained an MA and a diploma of education. He was in the NZEF in World War I. He taught at East Cape School in Invercargill for ten years, and was then Vice-Principal (1924–1929) then Principal (1929–1947) at the Auckland Teachers' Training College.

Rae suggested that an organisation for the protection of the country's heritage should be set up and put in a private member's bill in 1953. Whilst this did not proceed, the First National Government of New Zealand (of which he was a member) took responsibility of the issue and the Historic Places Act 1954 was passed, which established the National Historic Places Trust as a non-governmental organisation (NGO). This organisation has since evolved as an autonomous Crown entity known as Heritage New Zealand.

He was made Consul-General to Indonesia (1961–1963) then Chargé d'Affaires to Indonesia (1963).
 
He was appointed a Companion of the Order of St Michael and St George in the 1963 New Year Honours. He died suddenly on 3 February 1964 in Auckland.

Notes

References

|-

|-

1888 births
1964 deaths
New Zealand National Party MPs
New Zealand schoolteachers
Academic staff of the University of Auckland
New Zealand military personnel of World War I
University of Otago alumni
Ambassadors of New Zealand to Indonesia
Members of the New Zealand House of Representatives
New Zealand MPs for Auckland electorates
New Zealand Companions of the Order of St Michael and St George
People from Mataura